Than Myint (born 17 January 1943) is a Burmese politician and former Minister for Commerce of Myanmar (Burma).

Early life and education 
Than Myint was born on 17 January 1943 to Tin Maung and Daw San in the village of Sitkyun, Ingapu Township, Burma (now Myanmar).

Career 
He previously served as a National League for Democracy (NLD) Member of the House of Representatives for the constituency of Hlaingthaya.

In 2016 he was nominated as Minister of Commerce in Htin Kyaw's inaugural Cabinet, whereupon his academic credentials came under scrutiny and he was revealed to have listed a PhD on his CV from Pacific Western University (California), a now defunct institution which was not accredited, and had been found by a US congressional investigation to be a diploma mill which issued degrees without requiring students to meet stringent criteria of academic merit.

During the 2021 Myanmar coup d'état on 1 February, Than Myint was placed under house arrest by the Myanmar Armed Forces.

Personal life 
Than Myint is married to Thin Htay, a retired development bureaucrat and has no children.

References 

Living people
Members of Pyithu Hluttaw
National League for Democracy politicians
Place of birth missing (living people)
People from Ayeyarwady Region
1943 births